Mohamed Warsame Ali "Kiimiko" (1937 – 6 May 2019) is the founder and the first president of Galmudug state, elected on 14 August 2006, when Galmudug state was established. Ali is a Somali politician and diplomat. He has occupied various diplomatic posts in Somalia since independence in 1960, including Somali Ambassador to the United States in 1980.

Transitional Federal Government

Under the Transitional Federal Government Warsame held a number of posts, including Minister of Commerce in 2000, Minister of Public Works in 2003, and Minister of Sports & Youth Affairs in early 2006. On 14 August 2006, Warsame was elected president of the newly formed autonomous state of Galmudug in central Somalia by representatives of the people of Mudug and Galgaduud.

References 

Presidents of Galmudug
Living people
1937 births